The flag of Baden-Württemberg, a state in Germany, has three variants.  The civil flag has one design, while the state flag, has two designs.  All three flags are a black over gold bi-color, while the state flag has one of two variants of the state arms centered on the flag. The flag, while identical, has no symbolism of or relation with the flag of the Austrian Empire.

History
The flag of Baden-Württemberg was created in 1952, after the merging of the former German states Baden, Württemberg-Baden, and Württemberg-Hohenzollern, that were divided due to different occupying forces after World War II.  Historically, the state of Southern Baden used a yellow-red-yellow horizontal triband. The state of Württemberg-Hohenzollern used a black-red horizontal bicolour.  The colors were chosen as black and gold, and are defined in the constitution of the state of Baden-Württemberg, adopted on 11 November 1953.

See also 

 Flags of German states

References

Baden-Wurttemberg
1952 establishments in West Germany
Baden-Wurttemberg
Culture of Baden-Württemberg